Survivor: San Juan del Sur — Blood vs. Water is the twenty-ninth season of the American CBS competitive reality television series Survivor, which premiered on September 24, 2014.  Similar to Survivor: Blood vs. Water, the season features pairs of loved ones competing against each other but, unlike Blood vs. Water, all the players are new. The season was filmed in San Juan del Sur, Nicaragua, the same location as Survivor: Nicaragua and Survivor: Redemption Island. The two-hour finale and one-hour reunion show aired on December 17, 2014, where Natalie Anderson was named the winner over Jaclyn Schultz and Missy Payne.

This season saw the return of Exile Island, which was last used in Survivor: Tocantins. In lieu of a reward challenge, a castaway and their loved one would square off in a duel. The loser is sent to Exile Island, while the winner earns reward for his or her tribe and must send one of their tribemates to Exile Island as well. The two castaways who are sent to Exile Island then have to choose one of two vases, where in only one has a clue to a hidden immunity idol located at their tribe's camp. Exile Island continued after the merge with one castaway exiled by the reward winners, where there would be a single urn with a clue to an idol hidden somewhere on Exile.

Development and casting
The season was originally set to have 20 castaways: sisters So Kim and Doo Kim were originally cast but they dropped out before the game began due to a medical emergency. So eventually competed on the following season, Survivor: Worlds Apart. The season would continue with nine pairs, but with the first gender imbalance since Survivor: Fiji. While this season initially included Redemption Island, production decided to ultimately not use it for the season, and instead replaced it with the return of Exile Island.

On August 12, 2014, six weeks before the scheduled premiere, the post-production crew for the season went on strike, consequently endangering the premiere date. The approximately 20-person post-production team, who have been working on the show since its inception in 2000, demanded a better health insurance and pension fund. The strike ended a day later, leaving the premiere's intended airdate intact.

Contestants

The cast is composed of nine pairs of loved ones splitting into two tribes: Coyopa and Hunahpu, both named after Mayan warrior gods. With relationships including parent-child, siblings, and partners (both married and dating). Notable contestants include former professional baseball player John Rocker and two-time The Amazing Race contestants Natalie and Nadiya Anderson, who competed together on seasons 21 and 24.

Future appearances
Keith Nale, Jeremy Collins, and Kelley Wentworth returned for Survivor: Cambodia. Natalie Anderson was originally selected for Survivor: Game Changers but had to back out due to medical reasons. Wentworth returned again for Survivor: Edge of Extinction. Collins and Anderson later returned to compete on Survivor: Winners at War. Several contestants also appeared on seasons as part of the loved ones visit, with Dale Wentworth appearing on Survivor: Cambodia, Val Collins appearing on Survivor: Cambodia and Survivor: Winners at War, and Nadiya Anderson appearing on Survivor: Winners at War.

Outside of Survivor, Kelley Wentworth and Jeremy Collins competed on the premiere of Candy Crush. Natalie Anderson competed on the thirty-sixth season of The Challenge.

Season summary 
Due to one pair dropping out prior to the game, the season started with nine pairs of loved ones were separated onto two tribes: Coyopa and Hunahpu. Coyopa lost nearly every challenge; the tribe was initially dominated by a men’s alliance led by John, but Josh was torn between allegiances to the men and perpetual target Baylor. On Hunahpu, Jeremy and Natalie aligned after their loved ones were voted out, and argued with John at challenges over their loved ones' eliminations. Due to John's volatility, Josh orchestrated his ouster and took over the alliance. After a tribe swap, Missy—Baylor’s mother—came into power on Coyopa, while Josh and Jeremy vied for control on Hunahpu. While both men targeted each other, their conflict was never resolved as their tribe won every challenge.

At the merge, two factions emerged: Jeremy’s alliance with Natalie, Julie, Missy and Baylor, and Josh’s alliance with his boyfriend Reed, Wes and his father Keith, and Alec, with dating couple Jon and Jaclyn in the middle. While they prepared to side with Josh’s alliance for the first post-merge Tribal Council, it was cancelled after Julie quit the game, giving Jon and Jaclyn time to change their minds and side with Jeremy’s alliance to eliminate Josh. Jeremy’s fortune was not to last, and he was blindsided by his alliance sans Natalie. While Natalie rejoined her old alliance to pick off the remnants of Josh's alliance, Keith was spared as Natalie enacted her revenge, voting out Jon and Baylor and leaving no intact pairs of loved ones remaining. Keith then lost the final immunity challenge and was the last player voted out of the game.

Missy, Jaclyn, and Natalie were the final three. At the final Tribal Council, Reed eviscerated Missy’s character, comparing her to a “wicked stepmother” and chastising her for a lack of strategy, while Jaclyn was questioned for having only made moves with others, primarily Jon. Natalie was praised for making bold moves without a loved one's support, and was ultimately awarded the title of Sole Survivor with five votes to win, compared to Jaclyn’s two and Missy’s one.

In the case of multiple castaways who win reward, they are listed in order of finish, or alphabetically where it was a team effort; where one castaway won and invited others, the invitees are in square brackets.

Episodes

Voting history

Reception
Entertainment Weekly'''s Survivor columnist Dalton Ross called the cast "boring, if not boorish," and said that there were no standout moments from the season. Ross added, "This is not a season that inspires anger or rage, just apathy, which is maybe the worst indictment of all." Despite adding that the final episodes of the season were an improvement, as well as praising Anderson's post-merge gameplay, Ross ultimately ranked it as the sixth-worst season of the series, only ahead of One World, Thailand, Fiji, Nicaragua, and Island of the Idols. Survivor: Tocantins runner-up and People’s Survivor columnist Stephen Fishbach called it a "humdrum" season, and although it had "a great winner", he also called the Final Tribal Council "one of the worst in the show's history." While Tom Santilli of Examiner.com reserved some praise for aspects such as the idol plays and the memorability of Keith Nale, he said that the season "mainly consisted of a cast full of people who could only be considered as 'non-gamers,'" and ultimately concluded that "something about this season didn't quite click, and I'm afraid that most of it will be forgotten over time." Gordon Holmes of Xfinity similarly summarized: "I don't get this season. There are big, interesting moves, but it doesn't feel right. It just doesn't pop." Host Jeff Probst acknowledged the season as lackluster, especially in comparison to the previous four seasons. In response to whether or not he disliked most of the cast, he stated that "there was a lot of frustration this season", but similarly to Ross, added that "it got a lot better as it went along."

The season was ranked as the fifth-worst by Andrea Deiher of Zap2it in 2015, only ahead of Africa, Vanuatu, Thailand, and Redemption Island. In 2015, a poll by Rob Has a Podcast ranked this season 22nd out of 30, with Rob Cesternino ranking this season 15th. This was updated in 2021 during Cesternino's podcast, Survivor All-Time Top 40 Rankings, ranking 16th out of 40. In 2020, "The Purple Rock Podcast" ranked San Juan Del Sur 24th out of the 40 seasons, stating that the season "gets more interesting after the merge and has an excellent winner, but it’s hard to get past how unappealing this cast is." Later in the year, Inside Survivor'' likewise ranked this season 24th out of 40 calling the pre-merge "relatively unremarkable" but said that it improved after the merge with "a slew of entertaining blindsides, idol plays, and one of the all-time great winning endgames from Natalie."

References

External links
 Official CBS Survivor Website

2014 American television seasons
29
Television shows filmed in Nicaragua